The Chūsei Club was a pro-business political party in Japan.

History
The party was established by a group of 42 MPs in May 1924 following the May elections; 28 were first-time MPs and the remaining 14 were re-elected MPs, including some who had been members of the Koshin Club.

In May 1925 talks were held about a merger with Rikken Seiyūkai and the Kakushin Club. Although a merger did not happen, the Chūsei Club was dissolved when twenty of its MPs joined with the Reformist Club to form the Shinsei Club, eleven joined Rikken Seiyūkai and the remaining one became an independent.

References

Defunct political parties in Japan
Political parties established in 1924
1924 establishments in Japan
Political parties disestablished in 1925
1925 disestablishments in Japan